Semicassis is a genus of medium-sized predatory sea snails, marine gastropod molluscs in the subfamily Cassinae within the family Cassidae, the helmet snails and bonnet snails.

Species
According to the World Register of Marine Species (WoRMS), the following species with valid names are included within the genus Semicassis:
Semicassis adcocki (Sowerby III, 1896)
Semicassis angasi (Iredale, 1927)
Semicassis bisulcata (Schubert & Wagner, 1829)
Semicassis bondarevi Mühlhäusser & Parth, 1993
Semicassis bulla Habe, 1961
Semicassis canaliculata (Bruguière, 1792)
 Semicassis cancellata (Lamarck, 1803)
Semicassis centiquadrata (Valenciennes, 1832)
Semicassis craticulata (Euthyme, 1885)
 Semicassis decipiens (Kilburn, 1980)
 Semicassis dorae (Kreipl & Mühlhäusser, 1996)
 Semicassis dougthorni Dekkers, 2013
Semicassis faurotis (Jousseaume, 1888)
 Semicassis fernandesi (Kilburn, 1975)
 † Semicassis fibrata (P. Marshall & Murdoch, 1920) 
Semicassis glabrata (Dunker, 1852)
Semicassis granulata (Born, 1778) - synonym: Phalium granulatum (Born, 1778)
  † Semicassis grateloupi (Deshayes, 1853)
Semicassis inornata (Pilsbry, 1895)
 † Semicassis kaawaensis (Bartrum & Powell, 1928) 
Semicassis labiata (Perry, 1811)
 † Semicassis laevigata (Defrance, 1817) 
 †Semicassis lilliei (C. A. Fleming, 1943) 
 † Semicassis marwicki (C. A. Fleming, 1943) 
Semicassis microstoma (Martens, 1903)
 † Semicassis neumayri (Hoernes, 1875) 
Semicassis paucirugis (Menke, 1843)
Semicassis pyrum (Lamarck, 1822)
Semicassis royana (Iredale, 1914)
Semicassis saburon (Bruguière, 1792)
Semicassis semigranosa (Lamarck, 1822)
Semicassis sinuosa (Verco, 1904)
 † Semicassis skinneri (Marwick, 1928) 
Semicassis sophia (Brazier, 1872)
  † Semicassis subsulcosa (Hoernes & Auinger, 1884) 
  † Semicassis szilviae Kovács & Vicián, 2018
Semicassis thachi Kreipl, Alf & Eggeling, 2006
Semicassis thomsoni (Brazier, 1875)
Semicassis umbilicata (Pease, 1861)
 Semicassis undulata (Gmelin, 1791)
Semicassis westralis Kreipl, 1997
Semicassis whitworthi (Abbott, 1968)
 Semicassis zeylanica (Lamarck, 1822)
Species brought into synonymy
 Semicassis cicatricosa (Gmelin, 1791): synonym of Semicassis granulata (Born, 1778)
 Semicassis diuturna Iredale, 1927: synonym of Semicassis bisulcata (Schubert & J. A. Wagner, 1829)
 Semicassis japonica (Reeve, 1848): synonym of Semicassis bisulcata (Schubert & J. A. Wagner, 1829)
 Semicassis miolaevigata Sacco, 1890: synonym of Semicassis saburon (Bruguière, 1792) 
 Semicassis obscura Habe, 1961: synonym of Semicassis bulla Habe, 1961
 Semicassis pauciruge: synonym of Semicassis paucirugis (Menke, 1843)
 Semicassis persimilis Kira, 1955: synonym of Semicassis bisulcata (Schubert & J. A. Wagner, 1829)
 Semicassis pila (Reeve, 1848): synonym of Semicassis bisulcata (Schubert & J. A. Wagner, 1829)
 Semicassis salmonea Beu, Bouchet & Tröndlé, 2012: synonym of Semicassis bulla Habe, 1961

Extinct Species
Extinct species within this genus include:
Semicassis aldrichi  Dall 1890 †
Semicassis angasi  Iredale 1927 †
Semicassis deneseplicata  Martin 1916 †
Semicassis harpaeformis  Lamarck 1803 †
Semicassis labiata  Perry 1811 †
Semicassis monilifera  Sowerby 1846 †
Semicassis oligocalantica  Vredenburg 1925 †
Semicassis ovulum  Ortmann 1900 †
Semicassis pyshtensis  Addicott 1976 †
Semicassis reclusa  Guppy 1873 †

Fossils of species within this genus have been found all over the world in sediments from Eocene to Quaternary (age range: 37.2 to 0.0 million years ago).

References

 Powell A. W. B. (1979). William Collins Publishers Ltd, Auckland .

Cassidae
Gastropod genera
Extant Eocene first appearances